Manchester and District Cricket Association (MDCA) was an English cricket association which contained 17 teams spread around the Greater Manchester area. Founded in 1892, it supported two leagues for teams playing First XI cricket, two for Second XI cricket and a single league for Third XI teams; not all teams have a Third XI, which accounts for this difference. It was wound up after the 2013 season.

Club sides
 Bolton Indians
 Brooksbottom
 Bolton
 Burnage
 Bury (left after 2013 season)
 Friends Sporting Club 
 Deane & Derby
 Euxton
 Hindley St. Peter's
 Lostock
 Newton Heath
 South West Manchester
 Stretford
 Swinton Moorside
 Westleigh
 Whalley Range
 Winton
 Worsley
 Wythenshawe

These sides only compete in the 3rd team division and are feature their stronger sides in a different association.

 Astley & Tyldesley
 Flixton
 Heywood
 Stand

League structure

First XI
 Premier League
 Bury
 Deane & Derby
 Hindley St. Peter's
 South West Manchester
 Stretford
 Swinton Moorside
 Whalley Range
 Winton
 Worsley
 Wythenshawe
 Division One
 Bolton Indians
 Brooksbottom
 Bolton
 Euxton
 Lostock
 Newton Heath
 Westleigh

Second XI

 Division 2A
 Bury
 Deane & Derby
 Euxton
 Hindley St. Peter's
 South West Manchester
 Stretford
 Swinton Moorside
 Winton
 Worsley
 Wythenshawe
 Division 2B
 Bolton Indians
 Brooksbottom
 Bolton
 Lostock
 Newton Heath
 Westleigh
 Whalley Range

Third XI
 Division 3
 Brooksbottom
 Deane & Derby
 Heywood
 South West Manchester (3rd)
 South West Manchester (4th)
 Stretford
 Swinton Moorside
 Whalley Range
 Winton
 Worsley
 Wythenshawe

See also
Club cricket
List of English cricket clubs

External links
 Official website

Cricket administration in England
Cricket in Greater Manchester
Sport in the City of Salford
Sport in Manchester
Sport in the Metropolitan Borough of Bolton
Sport in the Metropolitan Borough of Bury
Sport in Trafford
Sport in the Metropolitan Borough of Wigan
Sports organizations established in 1892